Kokhono Asheni (English: Never Came) is a 1961 Pakistani Bengali-language art film, written and directed by Zaheer Raihan. It was his debut as a film director. The film was produced by Azizul Haque and Manjurul Haque. It stars Sumita Devi and Khan Ataur Rahman in lead roles with Sanjib Dutt, Shabnam, and Kana in supporting roles.

Cast
 Sumita Devi - Mary
 Khan Ataur Rahman - Shawkat
 Sanjiv Dutt - Sultan
 Shabnam
 Kona
 Mesbah
 Shahidul Amin
 Abdullah Yusuf Imam
 B, A, Malek
 Narayan Chakravarti
 Muffizul Islam
 Civil Majumder
 Mohammad Habib
 Chakan
 Taher
 Anima
 Devdas Chakravarti

Music
The film music directed by Khan Ataur Rahman.  There are six tracks in this film. Kalim Sharafi wrote the song "Kon Dur Batayone". The film singer are Mahbuba Rahman, Khan Ataur Rahman and Kalim Sharafi.

Track list

References

Further reading

External links
 

1961 films
1961 drama films
Bangladeshi drama films
Bengali-language Pakistani films
Films directed by Zahir Raihan
1960s Bengali-language films